KWG may refer to:

 A piece of German law called Kreditwesengesetz which regulates financial transactions.
 Kaba Deme language; ISO 639-3 language code KWG
 Kaiser Wilhelm Institute (Kaiser Wilhelm Gesellschaft), Germany
 Kew Gardens station (London), England; National Rail station code KWG
 Kite Wind Generator general wind power
 Kitegen (Kite Wind Generator), wind power from high altitude winds  
 Koolewong railway station, New South Wales, Australia; station code KWG
 Koninklijk Wiskundig Genootschap, the Royal Dutch Mathematical Society
 Kryvyi Rih International Airport, Ukraine; IATA airport code KWG
 KWG (AM), a radio station (1230 AM) licensed to serve Stockton, California, United States
 KWG Property, a property developer in Guangzhou, China